Stevan Jakovljević (7 December 1890 – 2 November 1962) was a Serbian author, biologist and professor.

He is most known as the author of the novel Likovi u senci and the trilogy Srpska trilogija.

Biography
Jakovljević graduated with a degree in biology from the University of Belgrade Faculty of Philosophy where he also later earned his doctorate. He was a professor at the University's Faculty of Pharmacy.

As an officer in the Royal Serbian Army, he fought in the Serbian Campaign of World War I. During World War II, he was held in Italian and German prisoner-of-war (POW) camps.

Jakovljević was a professor at the University of Belgrade and its rector from 1945 to 1950. He was also a member of the Serbian Academy of Sciences and Arts.

Published work
He made a name for himself in the literary world with his trilogy of novels published in 1937 titled Srpska trilogija which consist of the novels Devetstočetrnaesta (1935), Pod Krstom (1936) and Kapija slobode (1937). His other works include the novels Smena generacija (1939) about the social life in Belgrade during the interwar period, Velika zabuna (1952) which is a war chronicle of World War II and Likovi u senci (1956) which describes life as a POW in Italy and Germany.

He also published botanical papers titled Studije o biljnom svetu Prespanskog jezera, Makrofitska vegetacija Ohridskog jezera i Sistematika lekovitog bilja.

Personal life
His sister was Serbian author Milica "Mir-Jam" Jakovljević.

Death and legacy
Jakovljević died on 2 November 1962 and he is interred in the Belgrade New Cemetery. The gymnasium in Vlasotince is named after him.

References

External links 

1890 births
1962 deaths
People from Knjaževac
Serbian writers
Serbian novelists
Serbian biologists
Serbian botanists
20th-century Serbian novelists
20th-century biologists
University of Belgrade Faculty of Philosophy alumni
Members of the Serbian Academy of Sciences and Arts
Royal Serbian Army soldiers
Serbian military personnel of World War I
World War II prisoners of war held by Italy
World War II prisoners of war held by Germany
Burials at Belgrade New Cemetery